Sarah Jean Kelly (born September 13, 1976) is an American contemporary Christian musician from Rockford, Illinois.  She was signed to Gotee Records, a Christian label under EMI. Kelly is a two time Grammy Award nominee for albums "Take Me Away" and Where The Past Meets Today in the category of Best Rock Or Rap Gospel Album. Her music has compared to mainstream artists Sheryl Crow, Janis Joplin, Norah Jones, Carole King, and Sarah McLachlan. She runs a music school in The Woodlands, TX.

Personal life
Kelly is married to Jonas Ekman whom she met at a concert in Sweden. They were married in 2008. The couple lives in The Woodlands, Texas and she leads worship at Woodlands Church.

Discography

Sarah Kelly has also recorded a cover of "What If I Stumble," by Christian rock/pop group dc Talk, which appears on the compilation album ''Freaked! A Gotee Tribute to dc Talk's "Jesus Freak."'
Sarah Kelly was featured on Jars of Clay's single I'll Fly Away from the album Redemption Songs released in 2005
Sarah Kelly has recorded a cover of "Stand Up For Jesus," which was written by Adam Watts and Andy Dodd.

References

External links
 Official website of Sarah Kelly
 Sarah Kelly at Myspace

Living people
1976 births
Musicians from Rockford, Illinois
Performers of contemporary Christian music
American women pop singers
American women composers
21st-century American composers
American performers of Christian music
Gotee Records artists
21st-century American women singers
21st-century women composers
21st-century American singers